The Tsyklon-4, also known as Tsiklon-4 and Cyclone-4, was a Ukrainian carrier rocket which was being developed for commercial satellite launches. Derived from the Tsyklon-3, it had a new third stage, a larger payload fairing, and a modernised flight control system compared to its predecessor. The control system had been developed by JSC Khartron.

Specifications 
Tsyklon-4 was a three-stage-to-orbit expendable launch system, built on the successful Tsyklon-3 rocket and using improved versions of that rocket's first two stages. The new features were mostly in the newly developed third stage:

 The third stage has three times the propellant capacity of Tsyklon-3
 The new rocket engine RD-861K with multiple ignition capability (3 to 5 times)
 A modern western-like control system capable of precise orbit injections
 A new fairing derived from Ariane 4 is under development.

Tsyklon-4 would have improved the fuelling system, allowing safe capture of toxic vapours from the vehicle's hypergolic propellant system.

Development history 
Development began in 2002, with the maiden flight aimed for 2006. Following a series of production delays, this launch date slipped, and was estimated to occur some time after 2015.

Tsyklon-4 had been planned to launch from a proposed launch pad at the Alcântara Launch Center in Brazil, which would have given the rocket access to all orbital regimes. However, Brazil backed out of the partnership with Ukraine in 2015, citing concerns over the project budget, the ongoing financial situation in both countries, and the future of the commercial launch market. Yuzhnoye began developing a two-stage derivative of Tsyklon-4, the Cyclone-4M, for Maritime Launch Services, a Canadian launch service provider. The new rocket was originally scheduled to be in service by 2020, though this date has been repeatedly pushed due to construction delays at the Canso launch site. Construction is currently estimated to be complete by 2024 or 2025. The first flight of Cyclone-4M is currently expected to take place at Canso in 2023.

See also 
Tsyklon-2
Tsyklon-3
Cyclone-4M
Kosmos (rocket family)
Zenit (rocket family)

References

External links 
 Tsyklon-4 at Yuzhnoye.com
 RD-861K at Yuzhnoye.com
 Tsyklon-4 at Encyclopedia Astronautica

Space launch vehicles of Ukraine
Yuzhmash space launch vehicles
Cancelled space launch vehicles